Thelosia truncata is a moth in the Apatelodidae family. It was first described by William Schaus in 1894, as Trabala (?) truncata. It is found in Brazil (Parana).

References

Natural History Museum Lepidoptera generic names catalog

Apatelodidae
Moths described in 1894
Taxa named by William Schaus
Moths of South America